Ismael de Jesús Rodríguez Vega (born 10 January 1981) is a Mexican former footballer, who last played for C.D. Águila in the Primera División de Fútbol de El Salvador.

Career 
Trained in the C.F. Monterrey youth system, Ismael debuted in the México Primera División on 21 July 2001 in a game against UNAM Pumas. He quickly won a starting job and became a fixture in Monterrey's backline. During the Rayados title run in the Clausura 2003 tournament, Rodríguez played in 18 games and scored two goals, including a crucial score against Club Atlas in the playoff quarterfinals. His continued success at the club level brought him to the attention of Mexico national team coaches and personnel. In 2004, Rodríguez played for Mexico at the 2004 Olympic Summer Games.

Prior to the Apertura 2005 tournament, Ismael was transferred to Club América, who were at the time reigning champions of the Mexico league. An established starter at his previous club, Rodríguez was mostly a bench warmer at the beginning of the season; he saw significantly more action towards the end of the tournament.

International career 
It was not until Javier Aguirre came to coach the Mexico squad that Ismael Rodriguez finally got a chance to play with the Mexico Squad. He became one of Aguirre's main men because he started in every Gold Cup game.

International caps
As of 19 July 2009

Honours
Mexico U23
CONCACAF Olympic Qualifying Championship: 2004

Mexico
CONCACAF Gold Cup: 2009

External links 
 
 
 

1981 births
Living people
Mexican footballers
Olympic footballers of Mexico
Footballers from Tamaulipas
Liga MX players
C.F. Monterrey players
Club América footballers
Querétaro F.C. footballers
Irapuato F.C. footballers
Footballers at the 2004 Summer Olympics
Mexico international footballers
CONCACAF Gold Cup-winning players
2009 CONCACAF Gold Cup players
Association football defenders
People from Ciudad Madero
Footballers at the 2003 Pan American Games
Pan American Games bronze medalists for Mexico
Medalists at the 2003 Pan American Games
Pan American Games medalists in football